Anarchy in Action is a book exploring anarchist thought and practice, written by Colin Ward and first published in 1973.

The book is a seminal introduction to anarchism but differs considerably to others by concentrating on the possibility of an anarchism rooted in everyday experience, and not necessarily linked to industrial and political struggles. His ideas were heavily influenced by Peter Kropotkin and his concept of mutual aid. Ward bases his text on evidence from sociology, anthropology, cybernetics, industrial psychology, and from the experience of housing, town planning, education, work, play and social welfare. Ward argues for anarchist alternatives to the universal governmental and hierarchical systems of social organisation. This bucks a number of conventional trends of the socialist left, because he is quite critical of the welfare state.

Quotations 
"The argument of this book is that an anarchist society, a society which organizes itself without authority, is always in existence, like a seed beneath the snow, buried under the weight of the state and its bureaucracy, capitalism and its waste, privilege and its injustices, nationalism and its suicidal loyalties, religious differences and their superstitious separatism."

References

Bibliography
 
 
 
 

Books about anarchism
Anarchism and education
1973 non-fiction books